Lake Placid may refer to:

 Lake Placid, New York, site of the 1932 and 1980 Winter Olympics
 Lake Placid (New York), a lake near the New York village
 Lake Placid, Florida, a town in Highlands County, Florida
 Lake Placid, a lake in Collier County, Florida
 Lake Placid (Highlands County, Florida), a lake on the south edge of the town of Lake Placid, Florida
 Lake Placid, a lake in Pinellas County, Florida
 Lake Placid, Queensland, a suburb of Cairns, in far northern Queensland, Australia
 Lake Placid (Texas), a lake in Texas
 Lake Placid (film), a 1999 film directed by Steve Miner
 Lake Placid (film series)
 Lake Placid (Taiwan),  a lake in East District, Hsinchu, Taiwan